KWTO (560 kHz) is a commercial AM radio station in Springfield, Missouri.  It is owned by Zimmer Midwest Communications and airs a Talk Radio format.  The studios and offices are on East Chestnut Expressway in Springfield.

KWTO is powered at 5,000 watts by day and 4,000 watts at night.  It uses a directional antenna with a five-tower array. The transmitter is off Tower Lane in Ozark, Missouri, near U.S. Route 65.  The signal reaches parts of Missouri, Arkansas, Kansas and Oklahoma.  It provides at least secondary coverage as far north as Kansas City, as far west as Tulsa and as far south as Fort Smith.  Programming is also heard on 250 watt FM translator 93.3 K227AO.

Programming
Weekday mornings begin with Wake Up Springfield with Tim Jones.  Most of the remainder of the weekday schedule is made up of nationally syndicated conservative talk shows, including Rush Limbaugh, Gary Nolan, Guy Benson, Joe Pags, Jim Bohannon, Coast to Coast AM with George Noory, First Light with Michael Toscano and America in The Morning with John Trout.

Weekends feature shows on money, health, guns, home repair and religion, as well as repeats of weekday shows.  Weekend hosts include Chris Plante, Dana Perino and Bill Cunningham.  World and national news is provided by CBS Radio News.

History
KWTO was founded by Lester E. Cox and began broadcasting on December 25, 1933. Cox applied for and got the call sign KWTO, which stands for "Keep Watching The Ozarks." Cox also applied for several other licenses including KCMO in Kansas City.  At the time the Federal Radio Commission prohibited playing recorded music on the air, so the station had its own live bands.

From the 1930s through the 1950s, KWTO's staff musicians included Slim Wilson and the Tall Timber Trio, Chet Atkins, The Carter Family, Wynn Stewart, Les Paul, The Haden Family and The Goodwill Family. KWTO'S Korn's-A-Krackin''', a weekly "hillbilly variety" program, was carried nationally by the Mutual Broadcasting System. During the late 1940s and 1950s, the station played a key role in launching the careers of stars such as Porter Wagoner and The Browns. In 1954, the station began carrying Ozark Jubilee, which became an ABC-TV and radio show. In 1959, KWTO broke with its live music tradition and began playing country records, and for the next 30 years was known as "56 Country."

On October 22, 1990, KWTO ended its long-standing country format and became the region's first full-time news-talk radio station, which carries the programs of talk-show hosts including Rush Limbaugh Chris Plante, Jim Bohannon (who once worked at the station), and Joe Pags.

With his 2008 album Rambling Boy'', Charlie Haden acknowledged KWTO's country roots by featuring the station's transmission tower on the album's cover. On December 10, 2008, Rep. Roy Blunt recognized the station's 75th anniversary with remarks from the floor of United States House of Representatives.

On July 24, 2020, Meyer Communications announced it was selling its radio stations (KWTO, KWTO-FM, KTXR, KBFL (AM), and KBFL-FM) to Zimmer Midwest Communications.

References

External links

Radio stations established in 1933
Sports radio stations in the United States
WTO (AM)
CBS Sports Radio stations
1933 establishments in Missouri